Dimitrovgrad alternatively Caribrod is a town and municipality located in the Pirot District of southeastern Serbia. According to 2011 census, the municipality of Dimitrovgrad has a population of 10,118 people and the town 6,278.

Name
Since 1950, the official name of the town has been Dimitrovgrad, but the name Caribrod is also used. In Bulgarian, the name Tsaribrod is preferred because there is another Dimitrovgrad on the Maritsa river in Bulgaria and Tsaribrod was used before the town was named after Georgi Dimitrov, a Bulgarian Communist leader who advocated a union between the Bulgarians and remaining Yugoslav nations to form the Balkan Federation.

The idea was abandoned when Yugoslav leader Josip Broz Tito failed to reach agreements with Joseph Stalin (Tito–Stalin split); however, Dimitrov himself did not become unpopular in Yugoslavia from the breakdown and subsequently, the name of the town continued to be in honour of him despite many citizens themselves having preferred Caribrod.

There have been attempts to return the old name, Caribrod, but all had less than 50% turnout and most of them were in favor of keeping the name Dimitrovgrad. In 2019, local government decided to add tables with name Caribrod on several municipality's objects in order to please the needs of people who like the former name. In October 2019 municipal assembly decided to return the old name to the municipality. The document is sent to Ministry of Public Administration for further procedures.

Geography

Climate
Dimitrovgrad has a oceanic climate (Köppen climate classification: Cfb).

History
The Roman road Via Militaris was built in the 1st century AD and went through the town. In May 2010, well-preserved remains of the road were excavated during the work on Corridor 10.

An Ottoman military base operated in the west of Dimitrovgrad prior to the Balkan nations full independence.

During the Serbo-Bulgarian War, two battles were fought here, the 1st Battle of Caribrod and the 2nd Battle of Caribrod.

The Serbian and Bulgarian Prime ministers met at the then Tsaribrod in 1912 to discuss the disputed territories in Macedonia. The Kingdom of Serbs, Croats and Slovenes gained parts of the Principality of Bulgaria (known in Bulgaria as Western Outlands) which included Tsaribrod following the Treaty of Neuilly, signed on November 27, 1919.

From 1929 to 1941, Caribrod was part of the Morava Banovina of the Kingdom of Yugoslavia. It was occupied by Kingdom of Bulgaria between 1941 and 1944 during World War II.

Demographics

According to the 2011 census results, the municipality has 10,118 inhabitants.

Ethnic groups
Regardless of ethnic self-identification, most of the town's population speaks a South Slavic dialect usually called Torlak which includes linguistic features of both Serbian (especially phonology) and Bulgarian (postposed definite articles and lack of the infinitive verb form), as well as some entirely unique vocabulary.

Ethnic composition of the municipality:

Economy
The following table gives a preview of total number of registered people employed in legal entities per their core activity (as of 2018):

Gallery

See also
 Bosilegrad
 Western Outlands

References

External links

 

Populated places in Pirot District
Municipalities and cities of Southern and Eastern Serbia
Bulgarian communities in Serbia
Bulgaria–Serbia border crossings
Georgi Dimitrov